Giancarlo Politi (born 1937 in Trevi, Italy) is an art critic and publisher, mainly known for being the founder of Flash Art magazine.

Magazine
Politi was born in Trevi, in Umbria. He had a brief spell as an artist and poet before turning to art criticism. In 1965 he moved to Rome, where he started his own art magazine in 1967, a bilingual publication called Flash, and then changed it to Flash Art. In 1970 he moved the headquarters of the magazine to Milan, where he founded his own publishing house, Giancarlo Politi Editore. Politi started publishing art books, exhibition catalogues, and Art Diary, a directory to artists studios, art galleries, art critics and art institutions. 

In 1978 Flash Art was split into two separate editions, Flash Art Italia, mostly focused on the Italian market, and Flash Art International, covering the rest of the world. Over the years several attempts were made to publish the magazine in different languages, including Czech, French, German, Russian and Spanish. In 2004 he launched the first edition of the Flash Art Fair.

Museum
In 1993, Giancarlo Politi founded the Trevi Flash Art Museum. The museum has hosted several exhibitions featuring international artists, including Maurizio Cattelan, Vanessa Beecroft, Damien Hirst, Miltos Manetas, Piero Golia, Andres Serrano, Paola Pivi, Karen Kiliminik, and Mark Kostabi. In 2005 Politi withdrawn his support, and the museum is currently operating under the name Palazzo Lucarini Contemporary.

Biennale
In 2001, Giancarlo Politi started the so-called "no-budget biennales". The first one was held in Tirana, Albania, but then, following a disagreement with the local art institutions, he opted for Prague. The first Prague Biennale inaugurated in 2003 and was followed by five other editions as well as three editions of the Prague Photo Biennale.

Personal life
Politi is married to fellow art critic Helena Kontova. They have a daughter, Gea, who is currently an editor at Flash Art.

Controversies
Politi has often been a magnet for controversy. In 1972 he announced from the back page of Flash Art that he was selling his services for $1,000 to galleries, museums, and attractive female artists. In 1997 Politi publicly defended Alexander Brener for spraying a green dollar sign on Kazimir Malevich's painting Suprematisme. In 2011 a story emerged about an intern candidate who was mocked and offended after she has been denied a fair compensation. The episode raised some interest in Italy, due to a permanent situation of exploitation of youth work and skills of young graduates.

Bibliography
Poesia Umbra Contemporanea, Capitoli, Rome, 1960. 
Linea Umbra, Beniamino Carucci Editore, Rome, 1961. 
Giorgio Celiberti, Gallery 63, New York, 1963.
Sante Monachesi: Sculture, Bruno Alfieri, Venice, 1965.
Brajo Fuso, Edizioni Il Foglio, Piombino, Italy, 1967.
Dario Villalba, Galeria Vandres, Madrid, 1974.
Italian Painting Today, Multhipla, Milan, 1975.
Gianni Bertini, Castelli & Rosati, Milan, 1977. 
Flash Art: Two Decades of History, Politi Editore, Milan, 1990.
 Daniel Spoerri from A to Z, Fondazione Mudima, Milan, 1991.
Mimmo Paladino, Politi Editore, Milan, 1992.
Fabio Sargentini, Politi Editore, Milan, 1992.
Antico Amore, Edizioni Pulcino Elefante, Milan, 1992.
Panorama Italiano 1, Politi Editore, Milan, 1996.
Tirana Biennale 1: Escape, Politi Editore, Milan, 2001.
Prague Biennale 1: Peripheries become the Center, Politi Editore, Milan, 2003.
Prague Biennale 2: Expanded Painting, Politi Editore, Milan, 2005.
Pino Pascali, Cambi, Florence, 2006.
Prague Biennale 3: Glocal and Outsiders: Connecting Cultures in Central Europe, Politi Editore, Milan, 2007
Prague Biennale 4: Expanded Painting 3, Politi Editore, Milan, 2009.
Prague Biennale 5: New Location, New Face, Politi Editore, Milan, 2011.
Prague Biennale 6, Politi Editore, Milan, 2013.
Amarcord Vol. 1: Racconti Post-situazionisti di Arte e Anti Arte, Politi Seganfreddo, Milan, 2023.

References

External links
Art Diary
Flash Art
Good Reads

Italian magazine publishers (people)
1937 births
Living people
Italian art critics
Italian art curators
Italian magazine editors
Italian book publishers (people)
Italian magazine founders
Italian publishers (people)